Lohéac (Gallo: Lozeiac) is a commune in the Ille-et-Vilaine department in Brittany in northwestern France. The town is well known for cars and motorsport, hosting a rallycross track part of the FIA World Rallycross Championship, a tarmac racing circuit, a karting circuit, a quad bike circuit and the Manor of the Automobile, which hosts the Museum of the Automobile.

Image Gallery

Population
Inhabitants of Lohéac are called Lohéaciens in French.

See also
Communes of the Ille-et-Vilaine department

References

External links

Mayors of Ille-et-Vilaine Association 

Communes of Ille-et-Vilaine
Ille-et-Vilaine communes articles needing translation from French Wikipedia
Motorsport in France